Route 45 is a Connecticut state highway from US 202 in Washington to US 7 in Cornwall, in the rural northwest of the state.

Route description 

Route 45 begins as East Shore Road at an intersection with U.S. Route 202 in the New Preston section of the town of Washington. It heads north along the eastern shore of Lake Waramaug and soon enters the town of  Warren. In Warren, the road is known as Lake Road. An alternate route going around the south, west, and north shores of the lake can be accessed from Route 45. This western loop is an unsigned state highway known as Special Service Road 478. After Route 341 separates, Route 45 continues northward along Cornwall Road towards the town of Cornwall. It enters Cornwall after , becoming Warren Hill Road.

The  portion of Route 45 running along the east shore of Lake Waramaug is a state-designated scenic route. It runs from milepost 0.56 at West Shore Road in Washington to milepost 2.15 at North Shore Road in Warren. In 2010, the 0.50-mile segment of Route 45 running from the Junction with Route 202, through New Preston village, to the intersection with East Shore Road and Flirtation Avenue, also received state scenic designation.

History 
The road from New Preston to Warren center, and continuing north up to the Housatonic River south of Cornwall Bridge, was designated as a state highway in 1922. It was then known as Highway 152. Old Highway 152 was renumbered to Route 45 as part of the 1932 state highway renumbering.

Junction list

References

External links 

045
Transportation in Litchfield County, Connecticut
Washington, Connecticut
Warren, Connecticut
Cornwall, Connecticut